DZBF (1674 AM), broadcasting as Radyo Marikina is a radio station owned and operated by the Marikina City Government Public Information Office. The studio is located at the 2nd floor, Marikina City Hall, Shoe Ave., Marikina while its transmitter is at the Engineering Center, Gil Fernando Ave cor. Aquilina St., Marikina.

DZBF used to carry the branding Del Radio during Del de Guzman's stint as Mayor of the city from 2010 to 2016.

References

1994 establishments in the Philippines
Radio stations established in 1994
DZBF